Hopea erosa is a species of plant in the family Dipterocarpaceae. It is endemic to the southern end of the Western Ghats in India.

References

erosa
Endemic flora of India (region)
Flora of Karnataka
Flora of Kerala
Flora of Tamil Nadu
Critically endangered flora of Asia
Taxonomy articles created by Polbot